Fritz Stuessi (15 March 1945 – 8 July 1970) was a Swiss cross-country skier. He competed in the men's 30 kilometre event at the 1968 Winter Olympics.

References

1945 births
1970 deaths
Swiss male cross-country skiers
Olympic cross-country skiers of Switzerland
Cross-country skiers at the 1968 Winter Olympics
People from Glarus